Emmanuel Armah (born 22 April 1968) is a retired Ghanaian football defender.

He played for Hearts of Oak in Ghana, except for the 1994–95 season at Sportul Studențesc București in Romania. He was also capped for Ghana, and was a squad member in the 1992 African Cup of Nations and the 1997 Korea Cup.

Honours
Hearts of Oak
Ghanaian League Champions:1996–97, 1997–98, 1999
Ghanaian FA Cup: 1993–94, 1995–96, 1999
Ghana Super Cup: 1997, 1998
Ghana
 African Cup of Nations runner-up: 1992

References

External links
 

1968 births
Living people
Ghanaian footballers
Accra Hearts of Oak S.C. players
FC Sportul Studențesc București players
Expatriate footballers in Romania
Ghanaian expatriate footballers
Ghanaian expatriate sportspeople in Romania
Ghana international footballers
Association football defenders